Stéphane Walker (born 25 December 1990) is a Swiss figure skater. Competing in men's singles, he won ten international medals, including two on the ISU Challenger Series, and became a five-time Swiss national champion (2013–14, 2016–18). He appeared in the final segment at seven ISU Championships (six European Championships and the 2014 World Championships). Competing in Ice Dance with former partner Arianna Wroblewska, he is a two-time Swiss national silver medalist. As of July 2021, he is competing with Jasmine Tessari. They are the 2022 Swiss national champions.

Career

Early years 
Walker began learning to skate in 1994. His ISU Junior Grand Prix debut came in September 2007; he placed 20th at the Tallinn Cup in Estonia. In the 2007–08 season, he was coached by Heinz Wirz in Sion and Bern, Switzerland.

By the 2009–10 season, Walker was training under Myriam Loriol-Oberwiler in Neuchâtel. He was sent to the 2010 World Junior Championships in The Hague but was eliminated after placing 30th in the short program.

2010–2011 through 2012–2013 
In January 2011, Walker appeared at his first senior ISU Championship, the 2011 European Championships in Bern, and qualified for the final segment. He placed 10th in the preliminary round, 24th in the short program, 24th in the free skate, and 24th overall.

At the 2013 European Championships in Zagreb, Croatia, he ranked 24th in the short, 17th in the free, and 20th overall.

2013–2014 season 
In September 2013, Walker competed at the Nebelhorn Trophy, the last qualifying opportunity for the 2014 Winter Olympics, but his placement, 15th, was insufficient to earn a spot in Sochi, Russia.

Walker reached the free skate at two ISU Championships – he finished 17th at the 2014 European Championships in January in Budapest, Hungary, and 23rd at the 2014 World Championships in March in Saitama, Japan.

2014–2015 season 
Walker had surgery on his right foot in June 2014 and spent ten weeks in a cast. He resumed training in mid-November 2014. He competed at the 2015 European Championships in Stockholm and 2015 World Championships in Shanghai but was eliminated after the short program at both events.

2015–2016 and 2016–2017 seasons 
By December 2015, Walker was training under Franca Bianconi and Rosanna Murante in Sesto San Giovanni, Italy. At the 2016 European Championships in Bratislava, he placed 22nd in the short, 18th in the free, and 19th overall. He also qualified to the free skate at the 2017 European Championships in Ostrava, placing 19th in the short, 15th in the free, and 17th overall.

2017–2018 season 
Walker finished 9th at the 2017 CS Nebelhorn Trophy. Due to his result, Switzerland was the second alternate country for the men's event at the 2018 Winter Olympics. He placed 18th (16th in the short, 20th in the free) at the 2018 European Championships in Moscow. He did not advance to the free skate at the 2018 World Championships in Milan.

2018–2019 season 
In October 2018, Walker teamed up with Arianna Wróblewska to compete in ice dancing. Two months later they placed second at the Swiss National Championships.

Programs

Ice dancing

Single skating

Results 
CS: Challenger Series; JGP: Junior Grand Prix

Ice dancing with Tessari

Ice dancing with Wróblewska

Men's singles

References

External links 

 

Swiss male single skaters
1990 births
Living people
People from Sion, Switzerland
Competitors at the 2015 Winter Universiade
Competitors at the 2013 Winter Universiade
Competitors at the 2011 Winter Universiade
Sportspeople from Valais